Orin Samuel Kerr (born June 2, 1971) is an American legal scholar and professor of law at the UC Berkeley School of Law. He is known as a scholar in the subjects of computer crime law and internet surveillance. Kerr is one of the contributors to the law-oriented blog titled The Volokh Conspiracy.

Early life 
Kerr was born in 1971 in New York. His father is a survivor of the Holocaust. After graduating from Tower Hill School in Wilmington, Delaware, in 1989, Kerr studied mechanical engineering and aerospace engineering at Princeton University, graduating in 1993 with a Bachelor of Science in Engineering magna cum laude. He then did graduate study in mechanical engineering at Stanford University, where he received a Master of Science degree in 1994.

Kerr then attended Harvard Law School, where he was an executive editor of the Harvard Journal of Law and Public Policy and an editor of the Harvard Journal of Law & Technology. He graduated in 1997 with a Juris Doctor magna cum laude.

Career 
Kerr was a law clerk for Judge Leonard I. Garth of the U.S. Court of Appeals for the Third Circuit from 1997 to 1998. From 1998 to 2001, he was a trial attorney in the Computer Crime and Intellectual Property Section of the U.S. Department of Justice's Criminal Division. In 2001, he joined the faculty of George Washington University Law School.

In 2003, Kerr took a leave of absence from the law school to clerk for Justice Anthony M. Kennedy of the United States Supreme Court during October Term 2003. In 2009, he served U.S. Senator John Cornyn of the Senate Judiciary Committee as Special Counsel for Supreme Court Nominations during Sonia Sotomayor's confirmation as Supreme Court Justice; a year later, he again served as an advisor to Cornyn, this time on the Supreme Court confirmation of Elena Kagan.

Kerr was one of the lawyers for alleged MySpace "cyberbully" Lori Drew. His blog contributions at The Volokh Conspiracy often focus on developments in internet privacy law. He has been regarded as a leading scholar on Fourth Amendment jurisprudence in electronic communications and surveillance. Kerr was repeatedly cited in the Ninth Circuit's 2008 opinion Quon v. Arch Wireless Operating Co., Inc., which held that users have a reasonable expectation of privacy in the content of text messages and e-mails. The Supreme Court later took up the case, as Ontario v. Quon, and unanimously reversed. Kerr argued before the Supreme Court in the 2011 case Davis v. United States.

In response to a 2011 comment by Chief Justice John Roberts criticizing the irrelevancy of legal scholarship for focusing on issues such as Immanuel Kant's influence on 18th century evidentiary approaches in Bulgaria, Kerr wrote a short, humorous paper on the topic in 2015, finding that such influence was highly improbable.

Kerr filed an amicus curiae in support of the United States in Carpenter v. United States, a case concerning the government's seizure of an individual's historical cell phone locations records without a warrant.

Academia 
In 2012, he was appointed to a position as a scholar-in-residence at the Library of Congress; the two-year part-time position focused on information technology, privacy, and criminal justice. In 2018, Kerr joined the faculty of the USC Gould School of Law. In 2019, Kerr joined the faculty of the UC Berkeley School of Law.

See also 
 List of law clerks of the Supreme Court of the United States (Seat 1)

References

External links
 Video debate/discussion with Kerr and Marty Lederman on Bloggingheads.tv
 Kerr says online privacy has gone too far in the Harvard Law Record
 

1971 births
Living people
20th-century American lawyers
21st-century American lawyers
American bloggers
American legal scholars
Computer law scholars
Federalist Society members
First Amendment scholars
George Washington University Law School faculty
Harvard Law School alumni
Law clerks of the Supreme Court of the United States
Princeton University alumni
Stanford University alumni
United States Senate lawyers
USC Gould School of Law faculty
Writers from New York (state)
Writers from Wilmington, Delaware
Tower Hill School alumni